The FBK Games is an annual track and field event at the Fanny Blankers-Koen Stadion in Hengelo, Netherlands as part of the IAAF World Challenge Meetings. It was first organized in 1981. Its name honours Fanny Blankers-Koen, who won four gold medals at the 1948 Olympic Games.

It was known as the Adriaan Paulen Memorial from 1987 to 2000, in memory of another Dutch athlete.

History
From 2003 to 2009 IAAF classified the FBK Games among IAAF Grand Prix meetings.

World records
Over the course of its history, numerous world records have been set at the FBK Games.

Meeting Records

Men

Women

References

External links
 Official website
 FBK Meeting Records

Annual track and field meetings
IAAF Grand Prix
IAAF World Challenge
Athletics competitions in the Netherlands
Recurring sporting events established in 1981
IAAF World Outdoor Meetings